McIntyre Bluff (nʕaylintn) is a large ridge of rock, made of gneiss, located south of Vaseux Lake between Okanagan Falls and Oliver in British Columbia, Canada. The bluff rises prominently over the surrounding valley and is one of the most well known landmarks in the Okanagan.

History
nʕaylintn (pronounced nye-lin-tin) is the traditional nsyilxcen (Okanagan) language place name. First Nations in the area tell a story of a battle centuries ago on top of McIntyre Bluff. An enemy war party from the south (now Washington state) was lured to the top and driven over the cliffs.

McIntyre Bluff is named after Peter McIntyre, one of the Overlanders of 1862 who had also been a guard on the Pony Express in the American West. He was known as an "Indian Fighter".  In 1886 he received a land grant beside this great precipice.

Conservation
Most of the bluff is located within White Lake Grasslands Protected Area, which protects the Okanagan dry forests ecosystem located on top of it.

See also
Skaha Bluffs

References

External links

Ridges of British Columbia
Ridges of Canada
Similkameen Division Yale Land District